This is a list of episodes of the British television series Young Dracula.

Series overview

Episodes

Series 1 (2006)

Series 2 (2007–08)

Series 3 (2011)

Series 4 (2012)

Series 5 (2014)

Notes

References 

Episode guide taken from 
Episode summary season 4 taken from

External links 
 

Lists of British children's television series episodes